The Susan River is a northeastern California river of approximately  length that drains from an arid plateau of volcanic highlands along the Great Basin Divide to intermittent Honey Lake.  The river flows from eastern Lassen County from east of Lassen Volcanic National Park generally east past Susanville and emerging into a ranching valley to enter the north end of Honey Lake. Along with Fredonyer Pass, the Susan River is the northern boundary of the Sierra Nevada.

History
Susan River and the town of Susanville were named for Susan Roop, daughter of early settler Issac Roop, in 1857.

Watershed
Susan River begins at Caribou Lake at elevation , which is dammed by Caribou Lake 234 Dam. It flows eastward, curving southeasterly as it enters the Great Basin, where it is joined on the left by Bridge Creek and dammed to form McCoy Flat Reservoir, approximately 11 miles northwest of Susanville. It next receives order from the right (heading downstream) Crazy Harry Gulch, Willard Creek, and Williams Creek before entering Susanville, where it receives Piute Creek from the left. Below Susanville, it receives from the left Gold Run Creek, Lassen Creek and Sand Slough, the latter at Johnstonville. At Johnstonville, the Lake Leavitt Inlet Canal diverts Susan River flows south to Lake Leavitt. After being joined by Willow Creek from the left, the Susan River passes below Litchfield and is extensively modified by a complicated system of canals and levees for irrigation of the surrounding ranching areas. Next, the river reaches the Honey Lake State Wildlife Area and finally Honey Lake itself at elevation .

References

Rivers of Lassen County, California
Rivers of the Sierra Nevada (United States)
Rivers of the Great Basin
Lassen National Forest
Rivers of Northern California
Rivers of the Sierra Nevada in California